John Bellew Boyle (July 9, 1889 – April 3, 1971) was a Major League Baseball third baseman.

He is buried in Ogema, Wisconsin.

External links

Philadelphia Phillies players
1889 births
1971 deaths
Baseball players from Illinois
Louisville Colonels (minor league) players
Montreal Royals players
Burials in Wisconsin
People from Morris, Illinois